Santa Rosa is a mountain located in the limits of the regions of Huanuco, Lima and Pasco in Peru.

References 

Mountains of Peru
Mountains of Huánuco Region
Mountains of Lima Region
Mountains of Pasco Region